Waiting for Columbus is the first live album by the band Little Feat, recorded during seven performances in 1977. The first four shows were held at the Rainbow Theatre in London on August 1–4, 1977. The final three shows were recorded the following week at George Washington University's Lisner Auditorium in Washington, D.C. on August 8–10. Local Washington radio personality Don "Cerphe" Colwell can be heard leading the audience in a "F-E-A-T" spellout in between the first ("Join the Band") and second ("Fat Man in the Bathtub") tracks.

The band were backed by the Tower of Power horn section with whom they had recorded for their 1974 album Feats Don't Fail Me Now. The result was one of their biggest selling albums.

Many of their more well-known songs were either re-worked or extended. For instance, one of their signature songs, "Dixie Chicken", was heavily extended to include a lengthy piano solo by keyboardist Bill Payne, a Dixieland horn arrangement and finally a dual guitar jam between the band's two guitarists, Lowell George and Paul Barrère. In some cases, songs such as "Rocket in My Pocket" and "Mercenary Territory" were re-worked to include the horn section, and Little Feat additionally covered such tunes as Fraternity of Man's "Don't Bogart That Joint" and Allen Toussaint's "On Your Way Down" (which had also appeared on 1973's Dixie Chicken album). Former Rolling Stones guitarist Mick Taylor makes a guest appearance playing slide guitar on "A Apolitical Blues".

The band recorded and mixed enough material from these performances for a triple LP, but for marketing reasons kept it to a double album. Three of the unused tracks were included on their 1981 album Hoy-Hoy!. All were eventually released on the 2002 "Deluxe edition" CD.

It was voted number 804 in the third edition of Colin Larkin's All Time Top 1000 Albums (2000).

The cover art, by Neon Park, depicts items from the Americas unknown to Europeans before Columbus: an anthropomorphic tomato on a hammock in front of a backdrop of American native foliage and cactus.

Track listing

1978 double LP

Side one
"Join the Band" (Traditional) – 1:50
"Fat Man in the Bathtub" (George) – 4:50
"All That You Dream" (Barrère, Payne) – 4:25
"Oh Atlanta" (Payne) – 4:09
"Old Folks' Boogie" (Barrère, Gabriel Barrère) – 4:22

Side two
"Time Loves a Hero" (Barrère, Gradney, Payne) – 4:20
"Day or Night" (Payne, Fran Tate) – 5:23
"Mercenary Territory" (George, Hayward) – 4:27
"Spanish Moon" (George) – 4:49

Side three
"Dixie Chicken" (George, Martin Kibbee) – 9:00
"Tripe Face Boogie" (Hayward, Payne) – 7:02
"Rocket in My Pocket" (George) – 3:42

Side four
"Willin'" (George) – 4:42
"Don't Bogart That Joint" (E. Ingber, L. Wagner) – 0:57
"A Apolitical Blues" (George) – 3:41
"Sailin' Shoes" (George) – 6:18
"Feats Don't Fail Me Now" (Barrère, George, Kibbee) – 5:17

Vinyl reissue LPs
There have been two different half-speed mastered vinyl reissues on LP, both on the Mobile Fidelity label and containing the original full track list. The first reissue was released not long after the original Warner Brothers LP, was mastered by Stan Ricker, MFSL 2-013, and pressed by JVC in Japan and features a GOLD banner on the cover. The other is a 2011 release on Warner Brothers Records. This version is MFSL 2-322. It was mastered by Shawn R. Britton and pressed on 180g vinyl by Record Technology Incorporated in Camarillo, CA. This version features a GREEN banner the cover.

1990 single CD
In order to fit the double LP onto one CD, the tracks "Don't Bogart That Joint" and "A Apolitical Blues" were omitted from this release, but included as additional tracks on the CD issue of The Last Record Album.

"Join the Band" (Traditional) – 1:24
"Fat Man in the Bathtub" (George) – 4:52
"All That You Dream" (Barrère, Payne) – 4:31
"Oh Atlanta" (Payne) – 4:20
"Old Folks' Boogie" (Barrère, G. Barrère) – 4:27
"Time Loves a Hero" (Barrère, Gradney, Payne) – 4:19
"Day or Night" (Payne, F. Tate) – 5:31
"Mercenary Territory" (George, E. George, Hayward) – 4:37
"Spanish Moon" (George) – 4:42
"Dixie Chicken" (George, Kibbee) – 8:56
"Tripe Face Boogie" (Hayward, Payne) – 7:10
"Rocket in My Pocket" (George) – 3:48
"Willin'" (George) – 3:50
"Sailin' Shoes" (George) – 6:20
"Feats Don't Fail Me Now" (Barrère, George, Kibbee) – 5:21
Running time 74:00

2002 "deluxe edition" double CD
From the Rhino reissue liner notes (p. 23):
 Disc 1 (all) & Disc 2, Tracks 1-5: From the original release of Waiting for Columbus. [Note: For aesthetic reasons, the playing order of Sides 2 (tks 9-12) & 3 (tks 6-8) has been switched so that the band's main set (contained on Disc 1) now concludes with the long ovation that leads into the encore.]
 Disc 2 Tracks 6-10: Performances that were refurbished & mixed for the original album, but not used.
 Disc 2 Tracks 11-12: Selections that were apparently never considered for inclusion on either the original album or Hoy-Hoy!. They are newly mixed from the original multitrack tapes and do not contain any overdubs.
 Disc 2 Tracks 13-15: First issued on the album Hoy-Hoy!.
 [Note: This release now contains all the songs that were performed at the series of shows recorded for this album.]

Disc one
"Join the Band" (Traditional) – 1:54 - Lisner Auditorium, Washington D.C., August 10, 1977
"Fat Man in the Bathtub" (George) – 4:53 - Lisner Auditorium, Washington D.C., August 8, 1977
"All That You Dream" (Barrère, Payne) – 4:29 - Lisner Auditorium, Washington D.C., August 8, 1977
"Oh Atlanta" (Payne) – 4:20 - Lisner Auditorium, Washington D.C., August 8, 1977
"Old Folks' Boogie" (Barrère, G. Barrère) – 4:26 - The Rainbow Theatre, London England, August 4, 1977
"Dixie Chicken" (George, Kibbee) – 8:53 - The Rainbow Theatre, London England, August 3 & 4, 1977
"Tripe Face Boogie" (Hayward, Payne) – 7:09 - The Rainbow Theatre, London England, August 2 & 3, 1977
"Rocket in My Pocket" (George) – 3:57 - The Rainbow Theatre, London England, August 2, 1977
"Time Loves a Hero" (Barrère, Gradney, Payne) – 4:19 - The Rainbow Theatre, London England, August 4, 1977
"Day or Night" (Payne, F. Tate) – 5:30 - The Rainbow Theatre, London England, August 4, 1977
"Mercenary Territory" (George, E. George, Hayward) – 4:36 - The Rainbow Theatre, London England, August 2, 1977
"Spanish Moon" (George) – 5:36 - Lisner Auditorium, Washington D.C., August 8, 1977
Running time: 60:02

Disc two
"Willin'" (George) – 4:42 - Lisner Auditorium, Washington D.C. 08/08/1977
"Don't Bogart That Joint" (E. Ingber, L. Wagner) – 1:01 - Lisner Auditorium, Washington D.C., 08/08/1977
"A Apolitical Blues" (George) – 3:51 - The Rainbow Theatre, London England, 03/08/1977
"Sailin' Shoes" (George) – 6:23 - Lisner Auditorium, Washington D.C., 10/08/1977
"Feats Don't Fail Me Now" (Barrère, George, Kibbee) – 5:35 - Lisner Auditorium, Washington D.C., 09/08/1977
"One Love Stand" (Barrère, Gradney, Payne) – 4:27 - Lisner Auditorium, Washington D.C., 09/08/1977
"Rock and Roll Doctor" (George, Kibbee) – 4:17 - Lisner Auditorium, Washington D.C., 09/08/1977
"Skin It Back" (Barrère) – 5:40 - The Rainbow Theatre, London England, 02/08/1977
"On Your Way Down" (Allen Toussaint) – 6:25 - Lisner Auditorium, Washington D.C., 10/08/1977
"Walkin' All Night" (Barrère, Payne) – 4:12 - Lisner Auditorium, Washington D.C., 08/08/1977
"Cold, Cold, Cold" (George) – 5:18 - The Rainbow Theatre, London England, 04/08/1977
"Day at the Dog Races" (Barrère, Clayton, Gradney, Hayward, Payne) – 12:12 - Lisner Auditorium Washington D.C. 09/08/1977
"Skin It Back" (Barrère) – 4:40  - Lisner Auditorium, Washington D.C., 08/08/1977
"Red Streamliner" (Payne, F. Tate) – 4:59 - Lisner Auditorium, Washington D.C., 08/08/1977
"Teenage Nervous Breakdown" (George) – 4:12 - Lisner Auditorium, Washington D.C., 09/08/1977

2022 "super deluxe edition" eight CD 
This release includes a remastering of the original album plus three full live shows from the 1977 tour (Manchester, London, Washington D.C.).

Personnel

Paul Barrère – guitar, vocals
Sam Clayton – congas, vocals
Lowell George – lead vocals, guitar
Kenny Gradney – bass guitar
Richard Hayward – drums, vocals
Bill Payne – keyboards, synthesizer, vocals
Mick Taylor – lead and slide guitar ("A Apolitical Blues")
Michael McDonald and Patrick Simmons – backing vocals ("Red Streamliner")

Tower of Power horn section:
Emilio Castillo – tenor saxophone
Greg Adams – trumpet
Lenny Pickett – alto saxophone, tenor saxophone, and clarinet ("Dixie Chicken")
Stephen "Doc" Kupka – baritone saxophone
Mic Gillette – trombone, trumpet

Charts

Tributes
 On 31 October 2010, American rock band Phish covered Waiting for Columbus in its entirety as their "musical costume" for their Halloween show at the Boardwalk Hall in Atlantic City, New Jersey.
 On 31 December 2011, Little Feat along with former member Craig Fuller performed the entire set on Jimmy Buffett's Radio Margaritaville.

References

External links
 - provided by Warner Music Group
 - provided by Warner Music Group

Little Feat live albums
1978 live albums
Warner Records live albums
Albums with cover art by Neon Park
Albums produced by Lowell George